The 2014–15 Purdue Boilermakers women's basketball team will represent Purdue University during the 2014–15 NCAA Division I women's basketball season. The Boilermakers, led by ninth year head coach Sharon Versyp, play their home games at the Mackey Arena and were members of the Big Ten Conference. They finished the season 11–20, 3–15 to finish in tie for thirteenth place. They advanced to the second round of the Big Ten women's tournament where they lost to Minnesota.

Roster

Schedule

|-
!colspan=9 style="background:#B0936B; color:#000000;"| Exhibition

|-
!colspan=9 style="background:#B0936B; color:#000000;"| Non-conference regular season

|-
!colspan=9 style="background:#B0936B; color:#000000;"| Big Ten regular season

|-
!colspan=9 style="text-align: center; background:#B0936B"| Big Ten Women's Tournament

Source

Rankings

See also
2014–15 Purdue Boilermakers men's basketball team

References

Purdue Boilermakers women's basketball seasons
Purdue